Mysoria is a Neotropical genus of firetips in the family Hesperiidae.

Species list
Mysoria affinis (Herrich-Schäffer, 1869) Mexico
Mysoria amra (Hewitson, 1871) Mexico and Brazil.
Mysoria barcastus (Sepp, [1851]) Mexico, Costa Rica, Honduras, Colombia, Venezuela, Trinidad and Tobago, Bolivia, Paraguay, Argentina, Brazil, Surinam Guyane

References
Natural History Museum Lepidoptera genus database

External links
images representing Mysoria at Consortium for the Barcode of Life
Mysoria

Hesperiidae
Hesperiidae of South America
Hesperiidae genera